Mstislavsky (Russian Мстиславский) was a Russian princely family of Gediminid origin who prior to their move to Russia ruled the principality of Mstislavl. In the following, the Mstislavsky family produced some notable military commanders such as Ivan Mstislavsky who fought in the Livonian War. His son, Fyodor Mstislavsky was one of the Russian magnates during the Time of Troubles and the leader of the Seven Boyars who temporarily ruled the country.

External links
 Mstislavsky princes in History of the Russian nobility

Gediminids
Russian noble families
Ruthenian noble families